Kathryn Elizabeth Knapp (born September 14, 1938), also known by her married name Kay Norton, is an American former competition swimmer who represented the United States at the 1956 Summer Olympics in Melbourne, Australia.  She swam for the silver medal-winning U.S. team in the qualifying heats of the women's 4×100-meter freestyle relay.  Knapp did not receive a medal, however, because only relay swimmers who competed in the event final were medal-eligible under the Olympic rules then in effect.

References

1938 births
Living people
American female freestyle swimmers
Olympic swimmers of the United States
Swimmers from Washington, D.C.
Swimmers at the 1956 Summer Olympics
21st-century American women